Nicholas George Hagen Godoy (born 2 August 1996) is a Guatemalan professional footballer who plays as a goalkeeper for HamKam in the Norwegian Eliteserien and the Guatemala national team.

Club career 
On 4 September 2020, Hagen signed a contract with Sabail FK until the end of the 2020–21 season. On 30 July 2021, he signed a two-year contract with Norwegian club HamKam.

International career 
Hagen made his debut for the Guatemala national team on 18 August 2018.

Honours 
Municipal
Liga Nacional de Guatemala: Clausura 2017, Apertura 2019

HamKam
1.divisjon: 2021

References 

1996 births
Living people
People from Guatemala City
Association football goalkeepers
Guatemalan footballers
Guatemala youth international footballers
Guatemala under-20 international footballers
Guatemala international footballers
Liga Nacional de Fútbol de Guatemala players
C.S.D. Municipal players
Azerbaijan Premier League players
Sabail FK players
Norwegian First Division players
Eliteserien players
Hamarkameratene players
2015 CONCACAF U-20 Championship players
2021 CONCACAF Gold Cup players
Guatemalan expatriate footballers
Expatriate footballers in Azerbaijan
Guatemalan expatriate sportspeople in Azerbaijan
Expatriate footballers in Norway
Guatemalan expatriate sportspeople in Norway